Alexander Kops (born 23 November 1984) is a Dutch politician serving as a member of the House of Representatives since 2017. A member of the Party for Freedom (PVV), a nationalist, right-wing populist  political party in the Netherlands. He previously was a member of the Senate from 2014 to 2017.

Biography
Kops was born on 23 November 1984 in Leidschendam. In 2003 he obtained his propaedeutics as a German language teacher at the Rotterdam University of Applied Sciences. Kops then studied German at Leiden University between 2004 and 2009. He started as a German teacher at a high school in Leiderdorp in 2008. In the 2010 general election, he stood for the Party for Freedom, but as he was number 27 on the list he was not chosen. His contract at the high school was not renewed. In early 2011 he started as a policy worker for the Party for Freedom at the European Parliament. On 1 July 2014 he ended his contract there; on 8 July he was made member of the Senate. In the Senate he succeeded Marcel de Graaff, who had been elected to the European Parliament.

In the 2015 Senate election he held place fourteen on the Party for Freedom list, the party gained nine seats and Kops was elected on the base of preference votes. He gained the most votes of any Party for Freedom candidate. From 26 March 2015 until 12 April 2017 Kops concurrently served in the States of Overijssel. In the 2017 general election, he held place nineteen on the party's list. He was elected to the House of Representatives and subsequently resigned from the Senate. He took up his seat on 23 March 2017.

References

1984 births
Living people
21st-century Dutch politicians
Dutch educators
Leiden University alumni
Members of the House of Representatives (Netherlands)
Members of the Provincial Council of Overijssel
Members of the Senate (Netherlands)
Party for Freedom politicians
People from Leidschendam
20th-century Dutch people